The Malaysia Premier Futsal League (MPFL) is the national top-tier futsal league in Malaysia. It was previously known as the Liga Futsal Kebangsaan (LFK). The competition is separated into Men and women category.

Since its inception in 2004, the title has been won by seven different champions. The current champions is Selangor FA.

History 
In 2004, Football Association of Malaysia introduced the first futsal league (carnival format) sponsored by Hyundai. The league was known as Hyundai National Futsal Championship, which was then joined by 18 teams and was held at Sports Planet Ampang.

In 2006, the league was called Celcom National Futsal Championship after Celcom took over as the main sponsor. It was a carnival format which took place at four zones (North, Central, South & East). A total of 33 teams battled this time for the league title.

In 2007, FELDA took over as the official sponsor and was called as Liga Futsal Kebangsaan FAM/FELDA. The women categories were introduced for the first time in that year.

Figos RSA became the first club to win the title back-to-back in 2008-09 and 2009–10 season. In 2014–15 season, Felda United match the record after winning the season for the second times.

The league was on hold for 2016 season after a financial problem and postponed to January 2017 for the new season. For 2017 season, a total of 10 clubs was supposed to compete in men categories. However, Selangor withdrew from the competition before the start of the season. In women categories, a total of six clubs compete in the competition.

Logo evolution

Clubs 
Below are list of clubs compete in the 2019 Malaysia Premier Futsal League.

Venue

Champions

Players award

Golden Boot winners

Best player

Best goalkeeper

Best Young player

Number of appearances

See also 
 Liga Futsal Kebangsaan (Wanita)
 Malaysia national futsal team
 Malaysia women's national futsal team

References

External links 
 Football Association of Malaysia
 Arena Futsal Malaysia

 
1
Sports leagues established in 2004
2004 establishments in Malaysia
Malaysia